Nebria marginata is a species of ground beetle in the Nebriinae subfamily that is endemic to Xinjiang, province of China.

References

marginata
Beetles described in 1995
Beetles of Asia
Endemic fauna of China